The Greater Winnipeg Water District Aqueduct supplies the city of Winnipeg, Manitoba with water from Shoal Lake in the Kenora District of Ontario. It was put in service in 1919  and cost nearly CDN $16 million. The Greater Winnipeg Water District Railway was built for construction and maintenance of the aqueduct. The capacity was planned for a city of one million inhabitants; peak water usage by the city was in 1988 and the capacity of the aqueduct has never been entirely used. An additional  branch was completed in 1960.

History
The first water supply system in Winnipeg was installed and operated by The Winnipeg Water Works Company—a private concern—which obtained its charter on 30 December 1880. The charter was for a twenty-year period and the works were put into operation in 1882. The source of supply was the Assiniboine River, the intake and pumping station being located on the north bank of the river immediately downstream from the Maryland Street Bridge.

In April 1899, the City of Winnipeg purchased the plant of the Water Works Company for $237,650, making it a municipally owned and operated utility. At this time, the source of supply was changed from the Assiniboine River to artesian wells. In October 1900, the well supply was placed in operation.

Between 1900 and 1908, a group of seven wells was dug. In some years, their yield was not consistent and it was evident that a more adequate supply was needed for the rapidly increasing city population.

On 23 July 1906, a commission was appointed to investigate the best available source of water supply. The commission engaged the services of a group of engineers which, on 29 August 1907, submitted a report that recommended the City to go to the Winnipeg River for its future water supply. The commission endorsed this recommendation and forwarded it to the Winnipeg City Council on 30 October 1907. At this time, the City was undertaking the building of a hydro electric generating station at Pointe du Bois and was committed to the expenditure of a large sum of money. Consequently, the water supply project was postponed until 1912.

In 1912, the Public Utilities Commissioner, at the request of the City of Winnipeg, caused an investigation to be made and obtained an engineering report that recommended Shoal Lake—the western arm of the Lake of the Woods—as the source of water supply. The engineer's report also recommended sinking of additional wells to maintain a supply until the larger system could be completed. A comprehensive plan was developed in 1913 to form a metropolitan water district to supply not only the City of Winnipeg but several municipalities in the surrounding region. This resulted in the creation of the Greater Winnipeg Water District, incorporated by an Act of the Manitoba Legislature, and receiving Royal assent on 15 February 1913. The Act was passed contingent on the plan being approved by Winnipeg voters. The matter was submitted to vote on 1 May 1913 with 2,226 people in favour and 369 against.

On 7 April 1913, the Winnipeg City Council appointed a Board of Consulting Engineers to estimate the cost and general plan of the project to supply the Greater Winnipeg Water District with water from Shoal Lake. This report was submitted on 20 August 1913 and contained the following recommendations:
 That Shoal Lake water is of excellent quality for domestic and for manufacturing purposes;
 That Shoal Lake can be depended on to furnish all the water required for the Greater Winnipeg Water District until the population shall have reached about 850,000 and with the help of the Lake of the Woods can furnish a practically inexhaustible supply;
 That this water be brought from Shoal Lake through a covered concrete aqueduct 84.5 miles in length under open flow conditions to within about eight miles from St. Boniface, thence through a 5-foot 6-inch reinforced concrete circular pipe under pressure to the eastern bank of the Red River, thence through a  diameter cast iron pipe in tunnel under the river, and thence through a  diameter reinforced concrete pipe to the reservoirs at McPhillips Street.
The aqueduct between Shoal Lake and the Deacon Reservoir was to have a capacity of 85 million gallons per day and the pressure portion to be capable of delivering to the McPhillips Street reservoirs about 30 million gallons per day. The engineers estimated the total cost of the intake, Falcon River diversion works, concrete aqueduct, pressure portion, and tunnel to be $13,045,600, excluding costs for land acquisition and for interest charges during construction.

The engineering report was adopted by the Administration Board of the Greater Winnipeg Water District on 6 September 1913. A by-law was passed to raise the sum of $13,500,000 for the project by the issue and sale of debentures. The plan was put to Winnipeg voters on 1 October 1913 and was approved by a vote of 2,951 in favour and 90 against.

The project was carried out as outlined in the engineering report with the addition of a 250 million gallon reservoir at Deacon (about eight miles east of St. Boniface), a second 5-foot 6-inch pressure pipe from Deacon to the Red River, and a booster pumping station on the east bank of the Red River capable of delivering 50 million gallons per day to the reservoirs at McPhillips Street.

Surveying along the route of the aqueduct began in 1913 and construction commenced on 1 March 1914. The first work to be undertaken was the building of a  railway, including siding and spurs, a telephone line, clearing and fencing of the right-of-way, and completion of the Falcon River diversion. Construction of the aqueduct began in May 1915 and was virtually completed by the end of 1918.

On 29 March 1919, water from Shoal Lake arrived at the McPhillips Street reservoir and distribution to the City of Winnipeg began on 5 April 1919.

As a result of steadily increasing demand for water, construction of a booster pumping station adjacent to the Greater Winnipeg Water District's surge tank in St. Boniface was completed in 1950. This station allowed the District to fully develop the capacity of the existing works and to increase the flow to the City of Winnipeg from 30 to 42 million gallons per day. The station was equipped with three 20 million gallons per day pumping units with electrically controlled switchgear and electrically operated discharge valves. This was the first major addition to the District's aqueduct since the original works were completed in 1919.

In 1954, the District completed a direct  diameter pipe connection between the aqueduct and the Municipality of St. Vital, the cost being borne between the District and St. Vital. A pumping station was paid for and operated by St. Vital.

Equipment to fluoridate the water supply was installed at the aqueduct intake and operations commenced on 28 December 1956.

Description

On its way to Winnipeg the aqueduct and railway pass through East Braintree, McMunn, Hadashville, Spruce, Larkhill, Monominto, Millbrook and Deacon stations.
 
Over its length the aqueduct crosses eight rivers. The conduit was built using the "cut and cover" method with an unreinforced concrete arch resting on a cast in place base invert. Sections at road and rail crossings had reinforcing steel. Siphon crossings of rivers were made as reinforced round concrete tubes. The interior dimensions of the aqueduct were selected so that no internal pressure was developed by the water flow; nineteen different interior sections were required. For inspection and maintenance, manholes were provided at approximately 1 mile intervals, which  allow insertion of a small boat for inspections. Vent pipes in the manholes allowed controlled entry of air.

Structural design was complicated by the widely varying ground conditions, ranging from rock to soft peat soil. In some places, gravel fill was brought in to replace unsuitable material excavated.  The depth of backfill was intended to protect the aqueduct from freezing.

To allow surface water to drain freely across the path of the aqueduct, inverted siphons were installed at fifty-six locations. Freezing was prevented by ensuring the outlet level was always below water level, preventing cold air from entering the siphon.

Since the Falcon River entering Shoal Lake drains a considerable area of muskeg, a dike was built in the lake to prevent brown, organics-laden water from being drawn into the aqueduct. The intake structure included dual intake chambers to allow for maintenance of one while the other was in use.  Again, to prevent cold air from entering, the intake level was well below the lake level.

Initially the aqueduct terminated at a reservoir built on McPhillips Street, which had been the center of the city's original water system. This would allow for peak loads to be served in excess of the aqueduct's nominal capacity and allow for maintenance shutdowns of the aqueduct without interrupting the city's water supply. The McPhillips reservoir in the north-west part of the city holds  227 megalitres. The Wilkes reservoir in the southern part holds 251 megalitres. The McLean reservoir in the eastern part of the city holds 205 megalitres. The Deacon reservoir near , built in 1972 with eight open cells, holds 8800 megalitres, equal to a 20-day supply for the city. It is named after Thomas Russ Deacon, who as Mayor of the city drove efforts to secure the Shoal Lake water supply.

Greater Winnipeg Water District
The Greater Winnipeg Water District was a 64.42-square-mile area that included the City of Winnipeg (25.2 square miles), part of the City of St. Boniface (6.84 square miles), part of the City of St. James (7.27 square miles), part of the City of East Kildonan (3.46 square miles), part of the Town of Transcona (4.95 square miles), part of the Municipality of Fort Garry (8.04 square miles), part of the Municipality of St. Vital (5.53 square miles), part of the Municipality of West Kildonan (2.38 square miles), and part of the Town of Tuxedo (0.75 square miles).

The District was administered by a Board composed of the Mayor and four other members of the Winnipeg City Council, the Mayor and one member of the St. Boniface City Council, and the Mayors of St. James, East Kildonan, Transcona, Fort Garry, St. Vital, West Kildonan, and Tuxedo. The Mayor of Winnipeg was the ex officio Chairman and the work of the corporation was managed by a Board of Commissioners consisting of one to three persons.

The District sold water in bulk — without pressure — and at the same price, to the several participating municipalities. This price was at first based on the cost of maintenance, operation and management, the Greater Winnipeg Water District Act providing that interest and sinking fund charges should be levied on land only. The GWWD Act was amended in 1927 to allow a maximum price of five cents per thousand gallons to be charged, which became effective on 1 January 1938. Any surplus from sales was used to reduce the annual level based on the findings on an equalization board.

The District also operated a railway service between St. Boniface and Shoal Lake, and a sand and gravel business.

See also
Shoal Lake 40 First Nation

References

Further reading
  David Ennis, Developing a Domestic Water Supply for Winnipeg from Shoal Lake and Lake of the Woods: The Greater Winnipeg Water District Aqueduct, 1905 – 1919, retrieved 29 July 2014, Master's thesis with photographs, University of Manitoba.
"Pressure to Act: The Shoal Lake Aqueduct and the Greater Winnipeg Water District" by David A. Ennis, Manitoba History, Number 72, Spring-Summer 2013
"Not All Down Hill From There: The Shoal Lake Aqueduct and the Greater Winnipeg Water District" by David A. Ennis, Manitoba History, Number 75, Summer 2014

Aqueducts in Canada
Transport buildings and structures in Manitoba
Municipal Historical Resources of Winnipeg